This is a list of all tornadoes that were confirmed by local offices of the National Weather Service in the United States in April 2012.

United States yearly total

April

April 2 event

April 3 event

April 5 event

April 6 event

April 7 event

April 9 event

April 11 event

April 12 event

April 13 event

April 14 event

April 15 event

April 16 event

April 20 event

April 21 event

April 25 event

April 26 event

April 27 event

April 28 event

April 29 event

April 30 event

See also
 Tornadoes of 2012

Notes

References

 04
Tornado,04
Tornado
2012, 04